Dirk Willem van Leeuwen  (b 1945) is an Anglican clergyman. He was Archdeacon of North West Europe from 2005 to 2007.

Van Leeuwen was educated at Utrecht University and at the Southwark Ordination Course. He was ordained priest in 1983. He served the Diocese in Europe at Brussels, Haarlem, Antwerp, Charleroi, Ypres Leuven, Knokke, Bruges and Ostend. He was Vicar general of the Diocese in Europe from 2002 to 2007.

References

1945 births
Utrecht University alumni
Archdeacons of North West Europe
Living people
20th-century Anglican priests
21st-century Anglican priests